Biska Jatra, is an annual event in Bhaktapur, Dhapasi, Madhyapur Thimi and Tokha and other places in Nepal. The festival is celebrated at the start of the new year on the Bikram Sambat calendar, however, the festival itself is not related to Bikram Sambat.

Origin 
Legend has it that this celebration is the "festival after the death of the serpent". Various areas of Bhaktapur city celebrate this festival according to their own rituals. The most eventful places are Taumadhi Square and Thimi Balkumari. A chariot carrying the statue of Lord Bhairava is pulled by hundreds of people to towards upper (Thaney) and lower (Koney) neighbourhood as tug of war. Approximately a month earlier, the chariot is assembled near the Nyatapola temple.

Observations 
The signature event on Bhaktapur Taumadhi kicks off the Biska jatra "dya koha bijyaigu" which means the god Bhairava is brought outside from its temple for the festival, it is a tug-of-war between the Thane (upper) and Kone (lower) part of town. The chariot is pulled from both sides and whoever wins that part of town gets to take the chance of the chariot to their place while the other sides wait for their turn. The chariot is at last pulled down to gahiti where the chariot is kept for two days and again pulled down to Lyasinkhel on the eve of Nepali new year. 

The chariot is then pulled on the Lyasinkhel and kept till the next day. The  is pulled down on the eve of New Year. Then again the chariot is pulled to gahiti and on the last day which is also called " dya thaha bijyaigu" which means god Bhairava is again brought to temple,all the people are, the chariot is again pulled on both sides and finally settled to the premises of 5 storied temple.

Several places in Madhyapur Thimi (Thimi, Nagadesh and Bode) also celebrate Biska Jatra. Folks from various parts of Madhyapur Thimi gather, carrying their own chariots in Layeku Thimi. People celebrate and share greetings, throwing simrik color powder and playing Dhimay music.

Bode witnesses a tongue-piercing ceremony. One resident spends the whole day with an iron spike piercing his tongue and roams the city by carrying multiple fiery torches on his shoulder. Juju Bhai Shrestha is the most renowned tongue piercer town.

See also 

 Gai Jatra
 Indra Jatra
 Vaisakhi

References

External links
 All About Bisket Jatra
 Biska Jatra (Bisket Jatra): A fusion of tradition and Sole
 Photo story of Biska Jatra

Hindu festivals in Nepal
Nepali calendar
Culture of Bagmati